Enrico Carzino (27 September 1897 in Sampierdarena – 8 February 1965) was an Italian professional footballer who played as a goalkeeper.

His brother Ercole Carzino also played football professionally. To distinguish them, Enrico was referred to as Carzino I and Ercole as Carzino II.

External links
 http://www.enciclopediadelcalcio.it/Carzino.html

1897 births
1965 deaths
Italian footballers
U.C. Sampdoria players
Association football midfielders
People from Sampierdarena